is the name of a kind of awning which covers many entrances to stations in the Bilbao metro. These awnings are made with  glass and steel. They are named after Norman Foster, who designed the architecture for the stations of the system, as well as their entrances. These entrances can be seen in all the three lines of the network.

References 

Bilbao metro
Buildings and structures in Biscay
Foster and Partners buildings